Anil Swarup is an Indian author and retired Indian Administrative Service officer of Uttar Pradesh cadre and 1981 batch. Mr.Swarup in his 38 years of career has served in various capacities and later went on to become the Secretary to the Government of India.

Early life and education 
Anil Swarup was born on 01 July 1958 in Allahabad in the Indian state of Uttar Pradesh. He is a post-graduate in Political Science from the University of Allahabad in 1978, where he was awarded Chancellor's gold medal for being the "best all-round student".

Career 
Before joining IAS, he worked as an Indian Police Service officer for one year. Swarup joined IAS in 1981 and is the recipient of Director's gold medal for "best officer trainee" of his batch at the Lal Bahadur Shastri National Academy of Administration (LBSNAA).  

He has served in various key positions for both the Union Government and the Government of Uttar Pradesh, like as Education Secretary of India, Coal Secretary of India, Additional Secretary in the  Cabinet Secretariat of India, Additional Secretary of Labour & Empowerment, Export Commissioner in the  Ministry of Commerce & Industry of India and as the District Magistrate of  Lakhimpur Kheri during the  Babri Masjid-Ram Janmabhoomi agitation under then chief ministership of Kalyan Singh.

As Coal Secretary 
He became  Secretary in the coal ministry after the  coal scam in which the Supreme Court of India cancelled more than 200 blocks allocated since 1993. Swarup conducted coal auctions in a transparent manner, which was a huge success. In 2015, he was transferred to the Education Ministry when he refused to give coal produced by Coal India away at a discount to "privileged businessmen."

As an author 
Mr Swarup has authored following books

See also 
 Vijay Shankar Pandey, whistle blower IAS
 Ashok Khemka, whistle blower IAS 
 Sanjiv Chaturvedi, whistle blower IAS
 Ajay Rajput, whistle blower IAS

References

External links 
 Executive Record Sheet as maintained by Department of Personnel and Training of Government of India

Living people
1958 births
Indian Administrative Service officers